This list arranges card games by the number of cards used. The description "classic" refers to traditional playing cards that are well established today and which are divided into card suits. Cards which are not divided into traditional suits, are listed under "games with proprietary cards".

Where two or more packs are listed, games may be predominantly played with just one pack as indicated at the relevant article.

Games played with classic packs

Games played with 16 cards 
French pack shortened to: (4 suits of 4 cards: Ace, Queen, Jack, Ten)
 Baśka
 Kop

Games played with 20 cards 
German pack (4 suits of 5 cards: Deuce, King, Ober, Unter, Ten)
or French pack shortened to: (4 suits of 5 cards: Ace, King, Queen, Jack, Ten)
 Bauernfangen
 Bauernschnapsen
 Dreierschnapsen
 Schnapsen

Games played with 24 cards 
German pack shortened to: (4 suits of 6 cards: Deuce, King, Ober, Unter, Ten, Nine)
 Bierkopf
 German Solo (modern Hombre)
 Mucken (shortened pack)
 Schafkopf (shortened pack)
 Sixty-Six

Games played with 28 cards 
French pack shortened to: (4 suits of 7 cards: Ace, King, Queen, Jack, Ten, Nine, Seven)
 Skærvindsel

Games played with 32 cards 
German pack (Schafkopf: 4 suits of 8 cards: Deuce, King, Ober, Unter, Ten, Nine, Eight, Seven)
or French/Skat/Piquet pack (Skat: 4 suits of 8 cards: Ace, King, Queen, Jack, Ten, Nine, Eight, Seven)
 Bassadewitz
 Belote
 Bezique
 Blattla
 Bohemian Schneider
 Bräus/Brus
 Brusquembille
 Coinche
 Écarté
 Einwerfen
 Elfern
 Fingerkloppe
 Fünfzehnern
 German Schafkopf
 German Solo
 Grasobern
 Klaberjass
 Mau Mau
 Manille
 Mariage
 Mariáš
 Marjolet
 Officers' Skat
 Oma Skat
 Préférence
 Piquet
 Quodlibet
 Réunion
 Schafkopf (long pack)
 Schwimmen (Einunddreißig, Knack, Schnauz, Wutz, Bull, Hosn obi)
 Sedma
 Sheepshead
 Siebzehn und Vier
 Skat
 Tippen
 Ulti
 Wallachen
 Wendish Schafkopf

Games played with 33 cards 
German pack (William Tell/Double German: 4 suits of 8 cards: Deuce, King, Ober, Unter, Ten, Nine, Eight, Seven plus the Weli)
 Bieten
 Perlaggen
 Watten

Games played with 36 cards 
Games played with 36 cards may be of considerable antiquity as the standard German card pack reduced to 32 cards during the 19th century (see Dummett 1980). Several of these games are attempts to play the Tarot game of Grosstarock with standard French- or German-suited cards.
French pack F (Jass: 4 suits of 9 cards: Ace, King, Queen, Jack, Ten, Nine, Eight, Seven, Six),
German pack G (Tarock: 4 suits of 9 cards: Deuce, King, Ober, Unter, Ten, Nine, Eight, Seven, Six)
or Swiss pack S (Jass: 4 suits of 9 cards: Ace, King, Ober, Unter, Banner, Nine, Eight, Seven, Six)
 Bauerntarock (G)
 Bavarian Tarock (G)
 Bräus (F)
 Brus (F)
 Brús (F)
 Bruus (F)
 Bura (F)
 Dobbm (G)
 Durak (F)
 German Tarok (G)
 Hindersche (F)
 Schieber (S)
 Knack (F)
 Marjapussi (F)
 Scharwenzel (F)
 Six-Bid Solo (F)
 Skærvindsel (F)
 Svängknack (F)
 Tapp (F)
 Trekort (F)
 Tschau Sepp (S)
 Voormsi (F)

Games played with 40 cards 
Italian pack (4 suits of 10 cards: Re, Cavallo, Fante, 7–2, Aceo) or
Spanish pack (4 suits of 10 cards)
 Bestia
 Briscola
 Jeu Royal de la Guerre
 Lansquenet
 L'Hombre
 Mus
 Quadrille
 Scopa
 Sette e mezzo
 Tressette
Tarot/Tarock pack shortened to 19 trump cards, Fool and 4 suits of 5 cards:
 Zwanzigerrufen

Games played with 42 cards 
Shortened Tarock pack:
 Hungarian Tarock

Games played with 48 cards 
German pack (2 packs each of 4 suits of 6 cards):
 Binokel
 Doppelkopf
 Gaigel

French pack (2 packs each of 4 suits of 6 cards):
 Doppelkopf

French pack of 48 cards:
 Knüffeln
 Styrivolt

Swiss pack (4 suits of 12 cards):
 Kaiserspiel

Games played with 52 cards 
French-suited pack: (4 suits of 13 cards)
 3-2-5
 3-5-8
 500 Rum
 All Fours
 Auction Bridge
 Badugi
 Barbu
 Battle or Battle Royal
 Belle, Fluss and Einunddreißig
 Black Lady
 Black Maria
 Blackjack
 Bluke
 Bonken
 Boston
 Botifarra
 Bourré
 Bridge
 Cassino
 Cheat
 Clag
 Colonel
 Conquian
 Costly Colours
 Court piece
 Cribbage
 Cucumber
 Egyptian Ratscrew
 Femkort
 Forty-fives
 German Whist
 Gin Rummy
 Golf
 Gong Zhu
 Hearts
 Hucklebuck
 Indian Rummy
 Kachufool
 King
 Knockout Whist
 Köpknack
 Lanterloo
 Liverpool Rummy
 Mizerka
 My Ship Sails
 Napoleon
 Ninety-Nine
 Norseman's Knock
 Oh Hell
 Pedro
 Phat
 Pitch
 Poker 
 Put
 Ristikontra
 Rödskägg
 Rummy
 Shelem
 Sheng ji
 Sixty-three
 Smear
 Spades
 Tarneeb
 Staircase Rummy
 Texas hold 'em
 Turkish King
 Vira
 Whist

Games played with 54 cards 
Tarot/Tarock pack shortened to 21 trump cards, Fool and 4 suits of 8 cards:
 Cego
 Dreiertarock
 Illustrated Tarock
 Königrufen
 Neunzehnerrufen
 Point Tarock
 Strohmandeln
 Tapp Tarock

Games played with 58 cards 
French pack (Zwicker): (4 suits of 13 cards and 6 Jokers) 
 Zwicker

Games played with 62 cards 
78-card Swiss 1JJ Tarot pack minus the 1-4 of Swords and Batons and 7-10 of Cups and Coins:
 Troggu
62-card Tarocco Bolognese pack
 Tarocchini

Games played with 66 cards 
78-card French-suited tarot pack minus the 3 lowest cards of each suit:
 Droggn

Games played with 78 cards 
Tarot/Tarock pack (21 trumps, Fool and 4 suits of 14 cards):
 French tarot
 Großtarock
 Scarto
 Troccas

Games played with 97 cards 
Minchiate pack (40 trumps, Fool and 4 suits of 14 cards):
 Minchiate

Games played with 104 cards 
French pack (Poker/Bridge): 2 packs of 52 cards:
 Spite and Malice

Games played with 108 cards 
French pack (Canasta): 2 packs of 52 cards and 4 Jokers:
 Canasta

Games played with 110 cards 
 Armchair cricket
French pack (Rommé): 2 packs of 52 cards and 6 Jokers:
 Rommé

Games played with 312 cards 
(6 packs of 52 cards)
 Baccara
 Blackjack

Games played with proprietary packs - no additional equipment

Games played with 31 cards 
 Schwarzer Peter (variant: 2 × 15 pairs, 1 Schwarzer Peter)

Games played with 37 cards 
 Schwarzer Peter (variant: 2 × 18 pairs, 1 Schwarzer Peter)

Games played with 48 cards 
 Aluette (4 suits of 12 cards)

Games played with 56 cards 
 Golden ten (4 suits of 13 cards)
 Tichu (4 suits of 13 cards, 4 special cards)

Games played with 57 cards 
 Rook (4 suits of 13 cards, 1 special card)

Games played with 60 cards 
 Wizard (4 suits of 13 cards, 8 special cards)

Games played with 80 cards 
 The Great Dalmuti (78 number cards, 2 Jokers)
 Elfer Raus (4 suits of 20 cards)

Games played with 81 cards 
 Set

Games played with 104 cards 
 6 nimmt!

Games played with 112 cards 
 Uno

Games played with 160 cards 
 Ligretto

Games played with 162 cards 
 Skip-Bo

Games played with 500 cards 
 Dominion

Games played with 504 cards 
 Apples to Apples

Games played with 600 cards 
 Cards Against Humanity

Games played with proprietary packs - additional equipment

Games played with 16 cards 
 Love Letter

Games played with 55 cards 
 Jaipur

Games played with 60 cards 
 Hanabi

Games played with 63 cards 
 Caylus Magna Carta

Games played with 66 cards 
 23 (number cards 1–23 in quantity of their value (1x1, 2x2 ... 23x23), 12 bonus chips, 50 penalty chips)

Games played with 157 cards 
 7 Wonders

Games played with 160 cards 
 Race for the Galaxy

References 

+
Card games sorted by number of cards